7 Cancri (7 Cnc) is a giant star in the constellation Cancer.

Based on the Gaia distance, 7 Cancri has a bolometric luminosity 75 times that of the sun.

7 Cancri is a cool giant star.  It has evolved away from the main sequence after exhausting its core hydrogen and expanded so that it is larger and more luminous than the sun, although cooler.  It is one of 220 Flamsteed stars that are too faint to have been included in the Bright Star Catalogue.

References

Cancer (constellation)
K-type giants
Cancri, 07
066347
039447
Durchmusterung objects